V (TV series) may refer to:
 V (1983 miniseries), the original 1983 two-part television miniseries
 V: The Final Battle, a 1984 three-part sequel miniseries
 V (1984 TV series), a 1984–1985 TV series
 V (2009 TV series), a 2009 reimagining of the 1983 TV miniseries